Tibor Slebodník (born 21 September 2000) is a Slovak professional footballer who currently plays for Fortuna Liga club MFK Zemplín Michalovce as a midfielder, on loan from MŠK Žilina.

Club career

MŠK Žilina
Slebodník made his Fortuna Liga debut for Žilina against ViOn Zlaté Moravce on 13 February 2021. He came on in the second half, replacing Miroslav Gono and he netted a goal in the 83rd minute.

References

External links
 MŠK Žilina official club profile 
 
 Futbalnet profile 
 

2000 births
Living people
Sportspeople from Poprad
Slovak footballers
Slovakia under-21 international footballers
Association football midfielders
FK Poprad players
MŠK Žilina players
MFK Zemplín Michalovce players
2. Liga (Slovakia) players
Slovak Super Liga players